The Vingerklip (Afrikaans for "finger rock") s a rock needle built up from sedimentary rock layers of the Tertiary around 80 km southwest of the city of Outjo and approx. 50 km east of the city of Khorixas in northwestern Namibia. This rock formation is an erosion residue, a kind of mini-witness mountain of a layer level that extends further east parallel to and north of the Ugab. This layer level, like the finger of rocks, consists of deposits from the tertiary forerunners of the Ugab river system and tower over the recent valley of the Ugab by up to 160 meters. These deposits are predominantly carbonated sandstones and conglomerates.

The tip of this rock formation is 929 m above sea level, the rock itself is about 35 meters high and has a circumference of 44 meters at its base. In addition to the rock finger, there are some other, in some cases much larger, erosion residues in this area, that is, “real” witness mountains in the form of table mountains.

Since the collapse of Mukurob, this geological formation has been the most famous rock in Namibia.

Gallery

Literature 
 Gabi Schneider: The roadside geology of Namibia. 2. Editiom. Borntraeger, Stuttgart 2008, p. 120.
 Vingerklip & Ugab Terraces. Fact sheet, Geological Survey of Namibia, 2017 (PDF)

Rock formations of Namibia
National Monuments of Namibia
Geography of Kunene Region